Khoda Dadkosh may refer to:
Khoda Dadkosh-e Sofla